Rave is an Indian music magazine, first published in 2001. Although there was another magazine with same name which also covered the pop music scenes, they have no connection with one another.

History
Rave was launched by Rishi Shah in 2001 to cover music from India. It was modelled on Rolling Stone magazine. The magazine was published by Soul City Publications ten times a year. It was first published in the US in 2004. with its online edition starting in August 2007.

Rave moved to a digital format in 2016, and an attempted revival by Cross Bones Media took place at that time.

References

External links
 Official website

2001 establishments in India
2016 disestablishments in India
Defunct magazines published in India
English-language magazines published in India
Magazines established in 2001
Magazines disestablished in 2016
Music magazines published in India
Online magazines with defunct print editions
Online music magazines
Ten times annually magazines